Barnens brevlåda ("The Children's Letterbox") was a Swedish children's radio programme, led by Sven Jerring. It aired totally 1 785 times, between 11 September 1925 and 1972, making it the longest-lasting Swedish radio programme of that time. The record was broken on 14 November 1999 by the programme Smoke Rings.

References

1925 radio programme debuts
1972 radio programme endings
Sveriges Radio programmes
Swedish children's radio programs